Nalpathiyonnu (41) is a 2019 Indian Malayalam language satirical drama film directed by Lal Jose and written by P.G. Prageesh. It stars Biju Menon, Sharanjith, Nimisha Sajayan, Dhanya Ananya, Indrans and Suresh Krishna. in the lead roles. The film is produced by G Prajith, Anumod Bose and Adarsh Narayan and the music composed by Bijibal. This socio-political satire unravels through hilarious incidents when two people - strong followers of Communist ideologies-set out on a pilgrimage to Sabarimala. This is the 25th directorial venture of ace director Lal Jose. The film was released on 8 November 2019.

The film is inspired from true events. The climax of the film talks about the 2011 Pullu Medu stampede, the tragedy which shocked Kerala.

Plot
This socio-political satire unravels through hilarious incidents when two people - leftist, fellow traveller, rationalist and educator Ullas Mash and party activist Vavachi Kannan - set out on a pilgrimage to Sabarimala. The story begins with showing Ullas proving people on how people can cheat them and there is no God.

Cast

 Biju Menon as C. S. Ullas Kumar
 Sharanjith as Vavachi Kannan
 Nimisha Sajayan as Bhagyasooyam
 Dhanya Ananya as Suma
 Suresh Krishna as Ravi Nambiar
 Indrans as Kuttan Mesthiry, Bhagyasooyam's Father
 Shivaji Guruvayoor as Sebastian Mash
 Vijilesh Karayad as Lijo
 Srikant Murali-narayana swami
 Gopalakrishnan as Abubacker
 Elsy Sukumaran as Mother of Ullas
 Guru Manaf as Therali Mash
 Subheesh Sudhi as Parunthu Biju
 Kottayam Pradeep as Doctor Kochaniyan
 Sivadas Mattannur
 Sabu Thottapalli as Ambalapuzha Bustand Security

Soundtrack
Bijibal provided the music and background music for the film.

Release 
Naalpathyonnu (41) was released in India on 8 November 2019.

References

External links 
 

2019 films
Films directed by Lal Jose